Cairns may refer to:

Places
 Cairns, a town in Queensland, Australia
 Cairns Region, the current local government area
 City of Cairns, the former local government area
 Cairns City, Queensland, the central suburb and central business district
 Electoral district of Cairns, a district in the Legislative Assembly of Queensland
 The Cairns, a mixed-use district under development in Sandy, Utah, U.S.
 Cairns (Martian crater), on Mars
 Cairns, an area of Halfway, South Lanarkshire, Scotland
 Cairns of Coll, a region of rocky outcrops in shallow waters extending from the north end of the island of Coll in the Inner Hebrides of Scotland

Ships
 HMAS Cairns, a ship, and a shore establishment, of the Royal Australian Navy

People
 Aiden Cairns, Australian Rugby League player
 Alan Cairns (born 1930), Canadian retired political science professor
 Alun Cairns (born 1970), Welsh politician
 Andy Cairns (born 1965), Northern Irish musician
 Buster Cairns (born 1925), Canadian footballer
 Chris Cairns (born 1970), New Zealand cricketer
 David Cairns, 5th Earl Cairns (1909–1989)
 David Cairns (musician) (born 1958), English musician
 David Cairns (politician) (1966-2011), Scottish politician
 David Cairns (writer), British writer and music critic
 Don Cairns (born 1955), ice hockey player
 Eric Cairns (born 1974), ice hockey player
 Fred Cairns (1857–1896), British entertainer
 George Albert Cairns (1913–1944), British recipient of the Victoria Cross
 Graeme Cairns, New Zealand musician
 Holly Cairns (born 1989), Irish Social Democrat politician
 Hugh Cairns, 1st Earl Cairns (1819–1885)
 Hugh Cairns (surgeon) (1896–1952), British surgeon
 Hugh Cairns (VC) (1896–1918), Canadian recipient of the Victoria Cross
 Ian Cairns (born 1952), former World Champion surfer
 Imogen Cairns (born 1989), British gymnast
 Jim Cairns (1914–2003), Australian politician
 John Cairns (biochemist) (1922–2018), British biochemist
 John Cairns (Presbyterian) (1818–1892), 19th century Scottish divine and writer
 John B. Cairns (born 1942), former Moderator of the General Assembly of the Church of Scotland
 Kevin Cairns (footballer) (born 1937), English footballer
 Kevin Cairns (politician) (1929–1984)
 Lance Cairns (born 1949), cricketer
 Leah Cairns (born 1974), Canadian actress
 Mark Cairns (footballer) (born 1969), Scottish football goalkeeper
 Mark Cairns (squash player) (born 1967), English squash player
 Matt Cairns (born 1979), English rugby union player
 Rachel Cairns (born 1988), British actress
 Ronnie Cairns, English footballer
 Ryan Cairns (born 1984), Zimbabwean golfer
 Sally Cairns (1919–1965),  American film actress
 Scott Cairns (born 1954), American poet
  (born 1949), U.S. zoologist
 Tommy Cairns (1890–1967), Scottish footballer
 Warwick Cairns (born 1962), British author
 Wilfred Cairns, 4th Earl Cairns (1865–1946)
 William Cairns (1828–1888), British colonial administrator

Other
 Cairn, a type of stack of stones
 Cairns (sculpture), a 2008 work by Christine Bourdette in Portland, Oregon, US
 Clan Cairns, a Scottish clan
 Cairns Group, an interest group of 19 nations

See also
 Cairn (disambiguation)
 McCairns

English-language surnames